The Trustee Act 1925 (c 19) is an Act of Parliament of the United Kingdom passed on 9 April 1925, which codified and updated the regulation of trustees' powers and appointment. It accompanied the land reform legislation of the 1920s. It came into effect on 1 January 1926.

Title
"An Act to consolidate certain enactments relating to trustees in England and Wales."

Section 61
There is a discretionary power available to the courts under this section which allows a trustee's personal liability for a breach of trust to be lifted if it appears to the court that the trustee "has acted honestly and reasonably, and ought fairly to be excused for the breach of trust and for omitting to obtain the directions of the court in the matter in which he committed such breach". The trustee could be relieved from personal liability "either wholly or partly".

See also
English property law
English trusts law
Land Registration Act 1925
Trustee Act 2000

References

Further reading
WT Murphy, T Flessas and S Roberts, Understanding Property Law (4th edn Sweet and Maxwell, London 2003)
C Harpum, S Bridge and M Dixon, Megarry & Wade: The Law of Real Property (7th edn Sweet and Maxwell 2008)

Acts of the Parliament of the United Kingdom concerning England and Wales
United Kingdom Acts of Parliament 1925
English trusts law
English property law